The official languages of the Caribbean island-state of Aruba are Papiamento and Dutch, but most Arubans speak a minimum of four languages, including English and Spanish. Schools require students to learn English, Spanish and to a lesser extent French. According to the Government of Aruba the mother tongue and primary vernacular of almost all Arubans is Papiamento, an Afro-Portuguese Creole language spoken since the 16th century. The language, however, was not widespread in Aruba till the 18th and 19th centuries when most materials on the island and even Roman Catholic schoolbooks were written in Papiamento.

Dutch has been one of the official languages of the island for years as the island is a part of the Kingdom of the Netherlands. However, Dutch is the sole language for most administrative and legal matters. Aruba has recognized English as an international language, and has required that children learn English as early as the 4th grade. Use of English dates to the early 19th century, when the British took Curaçao, Aruba and Bonaire; when Dutch rule resumed in 1815, officials noted the already widespread use of the language. Since May 2003, Papiamento has also been an official language, alongside Dutch.  Aruba's location off the coast of South America has also made Spanish extremely important. Students begin learning this as early as 5th grade. Spanish became an important language in the 18th century due to the close economic ties with Spanish colonies in what are now Venezuela and Colombia, and several Venezuelan TV networks are received, and the fact that Aruba has Venezuelan and Colombian residents. Around 42% of the population today speaks Spanish.

Papiamento is a Creole language that evolved from Portuguese, Dutch, Spanish, some French, English, and a smattering of African languages. The language evolved in Curaçao during the 16th century when enslaved Africans and the Spanish enslavers developed common ground in which to communicate.

Papiamento was not considered important on Aruba until 1995. It was officially included in the school curriculum in 1998 and 1999. Since then, the island has embraced this native language. A Papiamento dictionary and fairy tales written in Papiamento are now readily available on the island.

Aruba is a polyglot society. Most of Aruba's population is able to converse in at least three of the languages of Papiamento, Dutch, English, and Spanish.

Selected Aruban Papiamento phrases

References

External links 
Ethnologue report for Aruba